Lake Wisconsin may refer to places in the United States:

Lake Wisconsin, Wisconsin, a census-designated place, Wisconsin, United States
Lake Wisconsin, a reservoir, Wisconsin, United States
Lake Wisconsin AVA, a wine region, Wisconsin, United States
Glacial Lake Wisconsin, an ancient lake

See also
Lake, Wisconsin (disambiguation), places in Wisconsin, United States